University Of Technology And Applied Sciences  (UTAS) is a public university operated in nine governorates . It has 11 different branches spread over the different part of the country. It was the first higher education institution in Oman. Currently, it is the largest higher education institution in Oman, catering to over 46,000 students studying in various programs.

By virtue of the Royal Decree (76/2020), the former Colleges of Technology (CoTs), the former Colleges of Applied Sciences (CAS), and the former Rustaq College of Education were merged under a single umbrella to form a university, thus, the establishment of a branch-based Higher Education Institution (HEI) called the University of Technology and Applied Sciences (UTAS) in January 2020. Such merging is motivated by the Oman Vision 2040[3] with focus on the National Strategy for Education 2040, Scientific Research Strategy, and the Innovation Strategy, keeping abreast with the modern challenges, priorities, and needs.
 
The UTAS has a population strength of 46,230 students who are registered in the Diploma, Advanced Diploma and Bachelor levels, taking a wide range of specializations in the fields of Pharmacy, Engineering, Applied Sciences, Business Studies, Information Technology, Applied Photography, Fashion Design, Education, Applied Biotechnology, Engineering, Mass Communication Studies, International Business Administration, Information Technology, and Design. With the increasing number of students, the UTAS has emerged as the largest university in the Sultanate of Oman.

Colleges of University of Technology and Applied Science
College of Creative Industries 
Design
Mass Communication
Photography
Fashion Design

College of Engineering and Technology
Chemical Engineering
Mechanical Engineering
Oil and Gas Engineering
HVACR Engineering
Electrical Engineering
Computer Engineering
Biomedical Engineering
Civil Engineering
Architectural Engineering
Geomatics Engineering 
Electronics and *Communication Engineering
Quantity Surveying and Cost Engineering

College of Education 
English Language 
Chemistry
Physics
Biology
Mathematics

College of Computing and Information Sciences
Software Engineering
Network Computing 
Information Systems
Data Science and Artificial Intelligence 
Cyber and Information Security

College Applied Science and Pharmacy
Applied Science
Applied Biotechnology
Pharmacy

College of Economics and Business Administration
Accountant
Marketing
Human Resources Management
Suply Chain and Logistics Management
Tourism and Hospitality Management

Branches of University of Technology and Applied Science 
 Muscat
 Salalah
 Suhar
 Nizwa
 Ibra
 Al-Musanaa
 Shinas
 Ibri
 Sur
 Rustaq
 Khasab

References

External links

2007 establishments in Oman
Educational institutions established in 2007
Colleges in Oman
Technical universities and colleges
Al-Rustaq
Ad Dhahirah North Governorate
Salalah
Nizwa
Sohar
Sur, Oman